Iranian South Medical Journal is a peer-reviewed open access quarterly biomedical publication that was established in 1997. The Iranian South Medical Journal publishes original articles, review articles, case reports, book reviews, letters to the editor, responses and short communications. Articles focus on diseases especially in the Persian Gulf and the Gulf of Oman region and analysis of various regional problems. The Iranian South Medical Journal is published by the research deputy of Bushehr University of Medical Sciences, affiliated with the Ministry of Health and Medical Education.

Abstracting and indexing 
The Iranian South Medical Journal is indexed and abstracted in Scientific Information Database, Magiran, and Iranmedex.

See also
Health care in Iran
Science and technology in Iran
Teb o Tazkieh

References

External links 
 

General medical journals
Publications established in 1997
1997 establishments in Iran
Academic journals published by universities and colleges of Iran
Persian-language journals
Multilingual journals